Paiyun is a Rural municipality located within the Parbat District of the Gandaki Province of Nepal.
The rural municipality spans  of area, with a total population of 15,381 according to a 2011 Nepal census.

On March 10, 2017, the Government of Nepal restructured the local level bodies into 753 new local level structures.
The previous Huwas, Taklak, Tribeni, Behulibans, Saraukhola and Bhorle VDCs were merged to form Paiyun Rural Municipality.
Paiyun is divided into 7 wards, with Huwas declared the administrative center of the rural municipality.

Demographics
At the time of the 2011 Nepal census, Paiyun Rural Municipality had a population of 15,381. Of these, 88.3% spoke Nepali, 9.1% Magar, 2.3% Gurung, 0.2% Newar and 0.1% other languages as their first language.

In terms of ethnicity/caste, 45.8% were Hill Brahmin, 22.1% Magar, 9.7% Kami, 4.5% Damai/Dholi, 4.4% Chhetri, 3.9% Gurung, 3.9% Thakuri, 2.8% Sarki, 1.6% Newar and 1.3% others.

In terms of religion, 91.2% were Hindu, 8.3% Buddhist, 0.3% Muslim, 0.1% Christian and 0.1% others.

References

External links
official website of the rural municipality

Rural municipalities in Parbat District
Rural municipalities of Nepal established in 2017